Kévin Hoggas (born 16 November 1991) is a French professional footballer who plays as a midfielder for Waasland-Beveren in the Belgian First Division B.

Career
In the 2009–10 season, Hoggas was promoted to the first team of his hometown club Racing Besançon after progressing through their youth academy. After the bankruptcy of the club in 2012, he moved to Belfort. Thanks in part to Hoggas' strong performances, the club won promotion to the Championnat National, the third tier in French football, for the first time in their history in 2015. Hoggas, however, went up two divisions: he won a transfer to Ligue 2 club Évian Thonon Gaillard. His time at the club, however, turned out to be a disappointment: Hoggas was a starter in Ligue 2, but the club finished in a relegation spot and were even demoted to one tier lower due to financial problems. However, Hoggas was able to continue playing in Ligue 2 as he was signed by Bourg-en-Bresse.

In January 2018, Hoggas made his first move abroad, signing a three-and-a-half-year contract with Cercle Brugge in the Belgian First Division B. With Cercle, he won promotion to First Division A after a few months. Newly appointed manager Laurent Guyot barely utilised him that season. Under his successors Fabien Mercadal and Bernd Storck, he received more playing time.

On 2 August 2021, Hoggas signed with recently relegated Waasland-Beveren in the second division.

Personal life
Born in France, Hoggas is of Algerian descent.

Career statistics

References

1991 births
Living people
Sportspeople from Besançon
Association football midfielders
French footballers
French sportspeople of Algerian descent
French expatriate footballers
Ligue 2 players
Racing Besançon players
ASM Belfort players
Thonon Evian Grand Genève F.C. players
Football Bourg-en-Bresse Péronnas 01 players
Cercle Brugge K.S.V. players
Belgian Pro League players
Challenger Pro League players
Expatriate footballers in Belgium
French expatriate sportspeople in Belgium
Championnat National 2 players
Championnat National players
Footballers from Bourgogne-Franche-Comté
S.K. Beveren players